Falkenham is a village and a civil parish in the East Suffolk district, in the English county of Suffolk, near the village of Kirton and the towns of Ipswich and Felixstowe. The population of the civil parish as of the 2011 census  was 170.

Description
The parish contains the hamlets of Falkenham Sink and Lower Falkenham. The parish church is dedicated to St Ethelbert and is a grade II* listed building. The major A14 road runs nearby.

The Falkenham Marshes are on the River Deben.

History 
At the time of the Norman Conquest the manor of Walton was linked with that of Falkenham. The villages only Public House, The Falkenham Dog, closed in 1975/6.

Location grid

See also 
Dommoc#Felixstowe

References 

 St Ethelbert's - A church near you
 History of village

Villages in Suffolk
Civil parishes in Suffolk